Shcherbinovsky District is an administrative district (raion), one of the thirty-eight in Krasnodar Krai, Russia. As a municipal division, it is incorporated as Shcherbinovsky Municipal District. It is located in the north of the krai. Its administrative center is the rural locality (a stanitsa) of Staroshcherbinovskaya. Population:  The population of Staroshcherbinovskaya accounts for 48.3% of the district's total population.

References

Notes

Sources

Districts of Krasnodar Krai